The 2020 Townsville Blackhawks season was the sixth in the club's history. Coached by Aaron Payne and captained by Sam Hoare, they competed in the Intrust Super Cup. The Blackhawks played just one game in 2020 after the season was cancelled due to the COVID-19 pandemic.

On 17 March, two days after the completion of Round One, the Queensland Rugby League (QRL) announced a 10-week suspension of the competition until 5 June, due to the COVID-19 pandemic. On 27 March, ten days after the suspension, the QRL confirmed the cancellation of the competition for the 2020 season. QRL managing director Robert Moore stated, “by making this announcement now, it provides our clubs with the opportunity to re-set and turn their attention towards the 2021 season."

Season summary

Milestones
 Round 1: Josh Hoffman and Moses Meninga made their debuts for the club.

2020 squad

Squad movement

Gains

Losses

Fixtures

Pre-season

Regular season

Statistics

References

2020 in Australian rugby league
2020 in rugby league by club
Townsville Blackhawks